Mohammed Awad (born 5 February 1949 in Alexandria) is a former Egyptian professional squash player.

He finished runner-up in the Egyptian championships in 1972 & 1975 and represented Egypt in the 1976 & 1977 World Team Squash Championships. He is the older brother of Gamal Awad, another notable squash player.

References

External links
 

Egyptian male squash players
1949 births
Living people
Sportspeople from Alexandria
20th-century Egyptian people